Mylne is a surname. Notable people with the surname include:

 Alfred Mylne (1871–1951), Scottish yacht designer
 John Mylne (d.1621), Scottish master mason
 John Mylne (d.1657), "John Mylne of Perth", Scottish master mason
 John Mylne (1611–1667), "John Mylne junior", Scottish architect and master mason
 Louis George Mylne (1843–1941), Anglican Bishop of Bombay from 1876 to 1897
 Robert Mylne (1633–1710), Scottish architect and master mason
 Robert Mylne (1733–1811), Scottish architect and engineer
 Robert William Mylne (1817–1890), British architect and geologist
 Walter Myln (d. 1558), Scottish Protestant martyr
 William Mylne (1734–1790), Scottish architect and engineer 
 William Chadwell Mylne (1781–1863), British engineer and architect

See also

 Milne (surname)
 Miles (disambiguation)
 Milnes (disambiguation)
 Myles (given name)
 Myles (surname)